NK GOŠK-Dubrovnik 1919 is a professional football club based in the city of Dubrovnik, Croatia. Its name comes from the Gruž neighbourhood of the city (Gruški Omladinski Športski Klub, in English Gruž Youth Sports Club).

History 
GOŠK was founded in 1919 and spent four years in the 1. HNL.

In the 1979, the two former rivals GOŠK and NK Jug were merged. The name of the new club was GOŠK-Jug and it continued under that name until Croatia broke away from Yugoslavia. GOŠK-Jug spent the entire 1980s in the Yugoslav Second League. Together with HNK Šibenik and RNK Split, the club frequently came close to promotion to the Yugoslav First League. This period is regarded as the club's strongest period in its history.

After the breakup of Yugoslavia the club once again merged with a local side, this time HNK Dubrovnik. The new institution competed in the first 1. HNL since Croatian independence. The year was a very strange one with the war still raging on. The club were unable to play their home games in Dubrovnik due to security threats, so played at a whole range of locations, including a famous match played at Korčula. It was very tough for the club to be competitive in these circumstances and lost their first nine games in the league. Luka Bonačić took over as manager and had many draws, many of them 0–0, with an ultra defensive style and doing so managed to lift the club of the bottom of the table and keep them in the first division.

The club managed to stay in the first division of Croatia for four years, but after relegation the club began to sink slowly into the mediocrity of the lower Croatian divisions.

Pero Vićan founded a new club in 1998 under the old name GOŠK. The old club disappeared due to financial difficulty while the new GOŠK continued to rise through the ranks. The new club reached the second division of Croatian football in 2000 and remained there until 2005. GOŠK finished second last in the 2. HNL season which meant they needed to play relegation play-offs – the first of which was against big rivals NK Konavljanin who they beat and then next against NK Karlovac to whom they lost.

GOŠK then dominated the 3. HNL, winning the league by 10 points and earning themselves a promotion playoff place. Their home ground in Dubrovnik was deemed unsuitable for the match so they played in Imotski, 150 km away from their home ground. NK Moslavina prevailed on away goals despite GOŠK winning the second leg 2–1, as they lost the first 1–0.

The next season, GOŠK let go a large number of players who brought them success the previous season. Despite scoring just one away goal all season and not earning a single point away from home, GOŠK maintained their third division status. In the following years GOŠK did just enough to stay up in the 3. HNL each year, forcing very young players into the first team to save on wages and because the club lacked the facilities to be granted a second division licence.

In the 2012–13 season, GOŠK did very will in the Croatian Cup reaching the quarter-finals where they lost to Lokomotiva Zagreb. In the first game played on Lapad, Lokomotiva won 1–0 while in the second leg at the Maksimir the game finished 0–0. Previously GOŠK the qualifying round passed without a fight Jedinstvo Omladinac from Nedešćina which was withdrawn from the competition, in the 1/16 finals GOŠK after the shootout was better than the second division Šibenik to the 1/8 finals after extra time was better than Nedelišće. On the quarterfinal draw GOŠK was given the first league side Lokomotiva Zagreb, which proved to be too strong rival, and after two games last remains uncertain, but this is the biggest success GOŠK in its recent history.

In the 2014–15 season, GOŠK was relegated from the 3. HNL, after finishing last. In the 2015–16 season, GOŠK competed in the fourth tier of football in Croatia, the 1. ŽNL Dubrovnik – Neretva. In that year, GOŠK was merged with HNK Dubrovnik 1919 and the club name was changed to NK GOŠK-Dubrovnik 1919.

The 2017-16 season saw GOŠK finish eighth in the 3. HNL.

Honours 
 Treća HNL – South:
Winners (2): 2000–01, 2005–06

 County Cup:
Winners: 2011–12

Notable players

 Zoran Mamić

Seasons

Yugoslavia (1979–1991)

Croatia (1998–present)

References

External links 
NK GOŠK Dubrovnik at the ŽNS Dubrovnik-Neretva website 
Soccerway profile

 
Association football clubs established in 1919
Football clubs in Croatia
Football clubs in Dubrovnik-Neretva County
Sport in Dubrovnik
1919 establishments in Croatia